Lazelle is a surname. Notable people with the surname include:

 Henry Martyn Lazelle (1832–1917), American Civil War veteran
 Keith Lazelle, American photographer

See also
 Lavelle